Yug is a rural locality (a settlement) and the administrative center of Yugovskoye Rural Settlement, Permsky District, Perm Krai, Russia. The population was 2,687 as of 2010. There are 61 streets.

Geography 
Yug is located 39 km south of Perm (the district's administrative centre) by road. Zvyozdny is the nearest rural locality.

Notable residents 

Ilya Berezin (1818—1896), Orientalist
Fyodor Panayev (1856—1933), teacher and climatologist

References 

Rural localities in Permsky District
Permsky Uyezd